Kerri Evelyn Harris (born December 24, 1979) is an American activist and politician who is the Democratic state representative for Delaware's 32nd district. She was previously a Democratic candidate for United States Senate in 2018, mounting an unsuccessful primary challenge to incumbent US Senator Tom Carper.

Political career 

In February 2018, Harris announced that she would be challenging three-term incumbent US Senator Tom Carper in the Democratic primary election. She ran on a platform supporting Medicare for All, universal pre-K, a $15 an hour minimum wage, and criminal justice reform, among other progressive proposals. Harris identifies as a progressive, but when asked if she was a democratic socialist, Harris said she "doesn’t necessarily consider herself one." She received endorsements from progressive groups and individuals, including Justice Democrats, Our Revolution, state representative Sean Lynn, and future congresswomen Alexandria Ocasio-Cortez, Ilhan Omar, and Ayanna Pressley. Ocasio-Cortez held multiple rallies with Harris in Delaware after Harris assisted her with her own successful primary campaign against incumbent congressman Joe Crowley. Harris lost to incumbent Senator Tom Carper in the September 2018 primary, receiving 35% of the vote. Despite her loss, Harris received the highest vote share of a Democratic primary candidate challenging a statewide incumbent in Delaware in 20 years. 

Harris announced in January 2022 that she would be launching a campaign for the Delaware House of Representatives in the 32nd district. Harris defeated three other candidates in the Democratic primary, receiving 65% of the vote. She defeated Republican Cheryl Precourt in the general election on November 8, 2022 by a 16-point margin.

Personal life 
Harris lives in Dover, Delaware. She joined the United States Air Force in 2001 following the September 11 terrorist attacks and retired from active duty in 2008. Harris identifies as a lesbian. She has two children.

Electoral history

References 

1979 births
21st-century American politicians
21st-century American women politicians
Activists from Delaware
Candidates in the 2018 United States Senate elections
Delaware Democrats
LGBT state legislators in Delaware
Living people
Lesbian politicians